Malidzano is a traditional Macedonian spread made from puréed bell peppers, eggplant, oil, salt and mustard (optional). It derives its name from the Italian word for eggplant, melanzane. Malidzano is usually served as an appetizer with a side of bread like spread and piece of white cheese. In other countries of Western Balkans (Serbia, Bosnia and Herzegovina, Croatia), it is prepared with both green or red peppers so the color of the spread depends from that.

See also
Eggplant salads and appetizers
Kyopolou
Pindjur

References

Macedonian cuisine
Eggplant dishes